This is a list of the Australian moth species of the family Saturniidae. It also acts as an index to the species articles and forms part of the full List of moths of Australia.

Attacus wardi Rothschild, 1910
Coscinocera hercules (Miskin, 1876)
Opodiphthera astrophela (Walker, 1855)
Opodiphthera carnea (Sonthonnax, 1899)
Opodiphthera engaea (Turner, 1922)
Opodiphthera eucalypti (Scott, 1864)
Opodiphthera excavus Lane, 1995
Opodiphthera fervida Jordan, 1910
Opodiphthera helena (White, 1843)
Opodiphthera loranthi (T.P. Lucas, 1891)
Opodiphthera rhythmica (Turner, 1936)
Opodiphthera saccopoea (Turner, 1924)
Opodiphthera sulphurea (Naumann, 2003)
Samia cynthia (Drury, 1773)
Syntherata janetta (White, 1843)
Syntherata leonae (Lane, 2003)

External links 
Saturniidae at Australian Faunal Directory
CSIRO ecosystem sciences, Australian Moths Online

Australia